Babilina Khositashvili (1884–1973) was a Georgian poet, feminist and labour rights activist. After a short spell in a monastery, she moved to Tbilisi where, unable to afford higher education, she studied in the library. She found employment in a publishing house and began to write poetry, initially about the problems of the working class, later about love and women's constant struggle for enhancement. She also worked as a translator.

In 1921, now married, she was able to embark on studies at the recently established Tbilisi University. On graduation, she undertook literary research over a period of four years but her work was not appreciated. Finding employment in a printing shop where she was able to observe the lives of workers, she developed an interest in the revolutionary movement. Later she turned to women's issues and feminism, concluding that women suffered from their lack of education and training. She became an active observer of the feminist movement, suffragism and world developments in women's emancipation.

See also
List of Georgian women writers

References 

1884 births
1973 deaths
People from Kakheti
19th-century writers from Georgia (country)
20th-century writers from Georgia (country)
20th-century women writers from Georgia (country)
19th-century women writers from Georgia (country)
Poets from Georgia (country)
Feminists from Georgia (country)
Suffragists from Georgia (country)